Nandigram Assembly constituency is an assembly constituency in Purba Medinipur district in the Indian state of West Bengal.

Overview
As per orders of the Delimitation Commission, No. 210 Nandigram Assembly constituency is composed of the following: Nandigram I and Nandigram II community development blocks.

Nandigram Assembly constituency is part of No. 30 Tamluk (Lok Sabha constituency).

Members of Legislative Assembly

1951 to 1967 (Nandigram North and Nandigram South)

1967 to present (as Nandigram)

Election results

2021
In the 2021 elections, Suvendu Adhikari of Bharatiya Janata Party defeated his nearest rival Mamata Banerjee of Trinamool Congress.

2016
In the 2016 elections, Suvendu Adhikari of Trinamool Congress defeated his nearest rival Abdul Kabir Sekh of CPI.

2011
In the 2011 elections, Firoja Bibi of Trinamool Congress defeated her nearest rival Paramananda Bharati of CPI.

2009 By election
The bypoll to the Nandigram Occurred On 5 January 2009 Due To Resignation of the sitting MLA of CPI Md. Iliyas Sk.

  
 

. Swing calculated on Congress+Trinamool Congress vote percentages taken together, as well as the CPI vote percentage, in 2006. Data for comparison not available for the 2009 by-election.

2006
 Illias Mahammad Sk (CPI) : 69,376 votes  
 Sk Supian (AITC) : 64,553
 Anwar Ali (Congress) : 4,943 votes

1996
 Debisankar Panda (Congress) : 61,885 votes  
 Sakti Bal (CPI) : 61747
 Joydeb Satpati (BJP) : 1,508 votes

1977–2009
In the bye election, necessitated by the resignation of the sitting MLA Illiyas Mahammad Sk. on corruption charges, held in January 2009 in the background of Nandigram violence, Firoja Bibi of Trinamool Congress defeated Paramananda Bharati of CPI.

In the 2006 and 2001 state assembly elections, Illiyas Mahammad Sk. of CPI won the 206 Nandigram assembly seat defeating his nearest rivals Sk. Supian of Trinamool Congress in 2006 and Sunil Baran Maiti of Trinamool Congress in 2001. Contests in most years were multi cornered but only winners and runners are being mentioned. Debisankar Panda of Congress defeated Sakti Bal of CPI in 1996. Sakti Bal of CPI defeated Debi Sankar Panda of Congress in 1991 and 1987. Bhupal Chandra Panda of CPI defeated Ramesh Chandra Gharai of Congress in 1982. Prabir Jana of Janata Party defeated Bhupal Chandra Panda of CPI in 1977.

1967–1972
Bhupal Chandra Panda of CPI won in 1972, 1971, 1969 and 1967. Prior to that Nandigram had two seats, Nandigram North and Nandigram South.

1951–1962 Nandigram North
Subodh Chandra Maity of Congress won in 1962, 1957 and in independent India's first election in 1951.

1951–1962 Nandigram South
Prabir Chandra Jana of Congress won in 1962. Bhupal Chandra Panda of CPI won in 1957. In independent India's first election in 1951, Prabir Chandra Jana of Congress won the Nandigram South seat.

See also
 2021 Nandigram controversy

References

Assembly constituencies of West Bengal
Politics of Purba Medinipur district